This article presents a list of the historical events and publications of Australian literature during 1925.

Books 

 Zora Cross — The Lute-Girl of Rainyvale : A Story of Love, Mystery, and Adventure in North Queensland
 Carlton Dawe
 Love, the Conqueror
 The Way of a Maid
 W. M. Fleming — Where Eagles Build
 Nat Gould — Riding to Orders
 Jack McLaren — Spear-Eye
 Henry Handel Richardson — The Way Home
 M. L. Skinner — Black Swans : rara avis in terris nigroque simillima cygno
 E. V. Timms — Hills of Hate
 Ethel Turner — The Ungardeners
 E. L. Grant Watson — Daimon

Poetry 

 Mary Gilmore
 "The Saturday Tub"
 "The Square Peg and the Round"
 The Tilted Cart: A Book of Recitations
 Henry Lawson
 Poetical Works of Henry Lawson
 Popular Verses
 Dorothea Mackellar — "Looking Forward"
 Furnley Maurice — Bleat Upon Bleat: A Book of Verses
 John Shaw Neilson 
 "The Lad Who Started Out"
 "The Moon Was Seven Days Down"

Children's and Young Adult fiction 

 Mary Grant Bruce — The Houses of the Eagle
 May Gibbs — The Further Adventures of Bib and Bub

Births 

A list, ordered by date of birth (and, if the date is either unspecified or repeated, ordered alphabetically by surname) of births in 1925 of Australian literary figures, authors of written works or literature-related individuals follows, including year of death.

 6 January — Rosemary Wighton, literary editor, author and advisor to the South Australian government on women's affairs (died 1994)

3 February — Keith Dunstan, journalist and author (died 2013)
 8 February — Francis Webb, poet (died 1973)
28 March — Richard Beynon, playwright, actor and television producer (died 1999)
 8 July — Vincent Buckley, poet and critic (died 1988)
 25 August — Thea Astley, novelist (died 2004)

Deaths 

A list, ordered by date of death (and, if the date is either unspecified or repeated, ordered alphabetically by surname) of deaths in 1925 of Australian literary figures, authors of written works or literature-related individuals follows, including year of birth.

 22 March — Ernest O'Ferrall, poet (born 1881)
 27 June — Simpson Newland, author and politician (born 1835)

See also 
 1925 in poetry
 List of years in literature
 List of years in Australian literature
 1925 in literature
 1924 in Australian literature
 1925 in Australia
 1926 in Australian literature

References

Literature
Australian literature by year
20th-century Australian literature